Druimdrishaig is a hamlet in Argyll and Bute, Scotland, on the shore of Loch Caolisport.

References

Geography of Argyll and Bute